Martin Abucha is the Minister of Mining for South Sudan.  He was appointed after the resignation of his predecessor, Henry Adwar Dilah.

References

Government ministers of South Sudan
Living people
Year of birth missing (living people)